William Harrison Withers Jr. (July 4, 1938 – March 30, 2020) was an American singer-songwriter and musician. He had several hits over a career spanning 18 years, including "Ain't No Sunshine" (1971), "Grandma's Hands" (1971), "Use Me" (1972), "Lean on Me" (1972), "Lovely Day" (1977) and "Just the Two of Us" (1981). Withers won three Grammy Awards and was nominated for six more. 

His life was the subject of the 2009 documentary film Still Bill. Withers was inducted into the Songwriters Hall of Fame in 2005 and Rock and Roll Hall of Fame in 2015. Two of his songs were inducted into the Grammy Hall of Fame.

Early life
William Harrison Withers Jr., the youngest of six children, was born in the small coal-mining town of Slab Fork, West Virginia, on July 4, 1938. He was the son of Mattie (née Galloway), a maid, and William Withers, a miner. He was born with a stutter and later said he had a hard time fitting in. His parents divorced when he was three, and he was raised by his mother's family in nearby Beckley, West Virginia. He was 13 years old when his father died. Withers enlisted in the United States Navy at the age of 17, and served for nine years, during which time he became interested in singing and writing songs.

Career
He left the Navy in 1965, relocating to Los Angeles in 1967 to start a music career.  His debut release was "Three Nights and a Morning" in 1967.  Arranged by Mort Garson, the song went unnoticed at the time but was later reworked by Withers as the track "Harlem."

Withers worked as an assembler for several different companies, including Douglas Aircraft Corporation, IBM and Ford, while recording demo tapes with his own money, shopping them around and performing in clubs at night. When he hit with the song "Ain't No Sunshine" in 1971, he refused to resign from his job because he believed the music business was a fickle industry.

Music career
Withers continued to work on his musicianship, learning guitar.

Sussex Records

In early 1970, Withers's demonstration tape was auditioned favorably by Clarence Avant, owner of Sussex Records. Avant signed Withers to a record deal and assigned former Stax Records stalwart Booker T. Jones to produce Withers's first album. Four three-hour recording sessions were planned for the album, but funding caused the album to be recorded in three sessions with a six-month break between the second and final sessions. Just as I Am was released in 1971 with the tracks, "Ain't No Sunshine" and "Grandma's Hands" as singles. The album features Stephen Stills playing lead guitar. On the cover of the album, Withers is pictured at his job at Weber Aircraft in Burbank, California, holding his lunch box.

The album was a success, and Withers began touring with a band assembled from members of the Watts 103rd Street Rhythm Band. Withers won a Grammy Award for Best R&B Song for "Ain't No Sunshine" at the 14th Annual Grammy Awards in 1972. The track had already sold over one million copies and was awarded a gold disc by the RIAA in September 1971.

During a hiatus from touring, Withers recorded his second album, Still Bill. The single, "Lean on Me" went to number one the week of July 8, 1972. It was Withers's second gold single with confirmed sales in excess of three million. His follow-up, "Use Me," released in August 1972, became his third million-seller, with the R.I.A.A. gold disc award taking place on October 12, 1972. His performance at Carnegie Hall on October 6, 1972, was recorded, and released as the live album Bill Withers, Live at Carnegie Hall on November 30, 1972. In 1974, Withers recorded the album +'Justments. Due to a legal dispute with the Sussex company, Withers was unable to record for some time thereafter.

During this time, he wrote and produced two songs on the Gladys Knight & the Pips album I Feel a Song, and in October 1974 performed in concert together with James Brown, Etta James, and B.B. King in Zaire four weeks prior to the historic Rumble in the Jungle fight between George Foreman and Muhammad Ali. Footage of his performance was included in the 1996 documentary film When We Were Kings, and he is heard on the accompanying soundtrack. Other footage of his performance is included in the 2008 documentary film Soul Power.

Columbia Records
After Sussex Records folded, Withers signed with Columbia Records in 1975. His first album release with the label, Making Music, included the single "She's Lonely," which was featured in the film Looking for Mr. Goodbar along with "She Wants to (Get on Down)". During the next three years he released an album each year with Naked & Warm (1976), Menagerie (1977; containing the successful "Lovely Day"), and 'Bout Love (1978).

Due to problems with Columbia and being unable to get songs approved for his album, he decided to focus on joint projects from 1977 to 1985, including "Just the Two of Us," with jazz saxophonist Grover Washington Jr., which was released during June 1980. The song won the Grammy Award for Best R&B Song. Withers next released "Soul Shadows" with the Crusaders, and "In the Name of Love" with Ralph MacDonald, the latter being nominated for a Grammy for vocal performance.

In 1982, Withers was a featured vocalist on the album Dreams in Stone by French singer Michel Berger. This record included one composition co-written and sung by Withers, an upbeat disco song about New York City titled "Apple Pie."

In 1985 came Watching You, Watching Me, which featured the Top 40-rated R&B single Oh Yeah! and ended Withers's business association with Columbia Records. Withers stated in interviews that a lot of the songs approved for the album, in particular, two of the first three singles released, were the same songs that had been rejected in 1982, hence contributing significantly to the eight-year hiatus between albums. Withers also stated it was frustrating seeing his record label release an album for Mr. T, an actor, when they were preventing him, an actual singer, from releasing his own. He toured with Jennifer Holliday in 1985 to promote what would be his final studio album.

His disdain for Columbia's A&R executives or "blaxperts," as he termed them, trying to exert control over how he should sound if he wanted to sell more albums, played a part in his decision to not record or re-sign to a record label after 1985, effectively ending his performing career, even though remixes of his previously recorded music were released well after his "retirement." Finding musical success later in life than most, at 32, he said he was socialized as a "regular guy" who had a life before the music, so he did not feel an inherent need to keep recording once he fell out of love with the industry. After he left the music industry he said that he did not miss touring and performing live and did not regret leaving music behind.

Post-Columbia career
In 1988, a new version of "Lovely Day" from the 1977 Menagerie album, entitled "Lovely Day (Sunshine Mix)" and remixed by Ben Liebrand was released. The original release had reached number 7 in the UK in early 1978, and the re-release climbed higher to number 4.

At the 30th Annual Grammy Awards in 1988, Withers won the Grammy for Best Rhythm and Blues Song as songwriter for the re-recording of "Lean on Me" by Club Nouveau. This was Withers's ninth Grammy nomination and third win. Withers contributed two songs to Jimmy Buffett's 2004 release License to Chill. Following the reissues of Still Bill on January 28, 2003, and Just As I Am on March 8, 2005, there was speculation of previously unreleased material being issued as a new album. In 2006, Sony Music gave Withers’s previously unreleased tapes back to him. In 2007, "Lean on Me" was inducted into the Grammy Hall of Fame.

At the 56th Annual Grammy Awards in 2014, Bill Withers: The Complete Sussex & Columbia Albums Collection, a nine-disc set featuring Withers's eight studio albums, as well as his live album Live at Carnegie Hall, received the Grammy Award for Best Historical Album (sharing the award with the Rolling Stones' Charlie Is My Darling – Ireland 1965). The award was presented to Leo Sacks, who produced the collection, and the mastering engineers, Mark Wilder, Joseph M. Palmaccio, and Tom Ruff.

In 2005, Withers was inducted into the Songwriters Hall of Fame. In April 2015, he was inducted into the Rock and Roll Hall of Fame by Stevie Wonder. He described the honor as "an award of attrition" and said: "What few songs I wrote during my brief career, there ain't a genre that somebody didn't record them in. I'm not a virtuoso, but I was able to write songs that people could identify with. I don't think I've done bad for a guy from Slab Fork, West Virginia." Later that year, a tribute concert in his honor was held at Carnegie Hall featuring Aloe Blacc, Ed Sheeran, Dr. John, Michael McDonald, and Anthony Hamilton. The concert recreated Withers's 1973 concert album, Live at Carnegie Hall, along with some of his other material. Withers was in attendance and spoke briefly onstage.

In February 2017, he made an appearance on Joy Reid's MSNBC show to talk about the refugee crisis as well as the political climate in America.

Legacy
Withers was known for his "smooth" baritone vocals and "sumptuous" soul arrangements. He wrote some of the most covered songs of the 1970s, including "Lean on Me" and "Ain't No Sunshine." The former entered the Hot 100 chart through multiple versions, including Club Nouveau's 1987 cover, which made the composition one of nine songs to have led the chart via different acts. With "Lovely Day", he set the record for the longest sustained note on a chart hit on American charts, holding a high E for 18 seconds. Editors from The Guardian considered that Withers's songs are "some of the most beloved in the American songbook," citing, "'Ain't No Sunshine' is regarded as one of the all-time great breakup tracks, while 'Lean on Me' [is] an ode to the supportive power of friendship..." For the same newspaper, Alex Petridis noticed "[he] laid pain and paranoia under his deceptively gentle songs, and retired early having conquered gospel, funk, blues, disco and more." In Rolling Stone, writer Andy Greene noted that several of his songs "are embedded in the culture and have been covered countless times."

Writing for The New York Times, Giovanni Russonello considered Withers "[a] soulful singer with a gift for writing understated classics," adding, "the ultimate homespun hitmaker, he had an innate sense of what might make a song memorable, and little interest in excess attitude or accoutrements. Ultimately Withers reminded us that it’s the everyday that is the most meaningful: work, family, love, loss." A Billboard article considered that Withers "stands as one of R&B/soul music's most revered singer-songwriters." In the same magazine, writer Gail Mitchell acknowledged "Withers' legacy has flourished in the decades since, thanks to a cross-section of artists who have covered/sampled his songs or cited him as a major influence." Musician and music journalist Questlove referred to Withers's post-breakup 1974 album +'Justments as "a diary [...] [it] was a pre-reality-show look at his life. Keep in mind this was years before Marvin Gaye did it with Here, My Dear." The Beach Boys' Brian Wilson deemed him "a songwriter's songwriter." Musicians Sade, D'Angelo, Justin Timberlake, John Legend and Ed Sheeran have credited Withers as a music inspiration.

Personal life and death

Withers married actress Denise Nicholas in 1973 during her stint on the sitcom Room 222. They divorced in 1974.

In 1976, Withers married Marcia Johnson. They had two children, Todd and Kori. Marcia eventually assumed the direct management of his publishing companies, in which his children also became involved as they became adults.

Withers died from heart complications in a Los Angeles hospital on March 30, 2020, at age 81; his family announced his death four days later. He is interred in the Forest Lawn Memorial Park.

Discography

Studio albums
 Just as I Am (1971)
 Still Bill (1972)
 +'Justments (1974)
 Making Music (1975)
 Naked & Warm (1976)
 Menagerie (1977)
 'Bout Love (1978)
 Watching You, Watching Me (1985)

Live albums
 Live at Carnegie Hall (1973)

Compilation albums
 The Best of Bill Withers (1975)
 The Best of Bill Withers (1980)
 Bill Withers' Greatest Hits (1981)
 Lean on Me: The Best of Bill Withers (1994)
 The Best of Bill Withers: Lean on Me (2000)
 The Ultimate Bill Withers Collection (2000)
 Lovely Day: The Very Best of Bill Withers (2005)
 Ain't No Sunshine: The Best of Bill Withers (2008)
 Playlist: The Very Best of Bill Withers (2009)
 The Essential Bill Withers (2013)

Accolades

Grammy Awards
The Grammy Awards are bestowed by The Recording Academy. Withers has won three Grammys from nine nominations.

|-
| rowspan="3"| 1971
| Bill Withers
| Best New Artist
| 
|-
| rowspan="2"| "Ain't No Sunshine"
| Best Pop Vocal Performance Male
| 
|-
| Best Rhythm & Blues Song
| 
|-
| rowspan="4"| 1981
| rowspan="4"| "Just the Two of Us"
| Record of the Year
|  
|-
| Song of the Year
| 
|-
| Best Pop Vocal Performance Male
|  
|-
| Best Rhythm & Blues Song
| 
|-
| 1984
| "In the Name of Love" (featuring Ralph MacDonald)
| Best Male R&B Vocal Performance
| 
|-
| 1987
| "Lean on Me"
| Best Rhythm & Blues Song
| 
|-

Honors
 2005: Inducted into Songwriters Hall of Fame
 2006: ASCAP Rhythm & Soul Heritage award
 2007: Inducted into West Virginia Music Hall of Fame
 2015: Inducted into Rock and Roll Hall of Fame
 2017: Honorary degree from West Virginia University

References

External links

 
 
 
 
 
 Biography at Soultracks.com

 
1938 births
2020 deaths
20th-century American guitarists
20th-century American keyboardists
20th-century American pianists
21st-century American pianists
African-American male singer-songwriters
American baritones
American funk guitarists
American funk keyboardists
American funk singers
American male guitarists
American male pianists
American rhythm and blues guitarists
American rhythm and blues keyboardists
American rhythm and blues musicians
American rhythm and blues singers
American soul guitarists
American soul keyboardists
American soul singers
Burials at Forest Lawn Memorial Park (Hollywood Hills)
Columbia Records artists
Grammy Award winners
Guitarists from West Virginia
Military personnel from West Virginia
People from Slab Fork, West Virginia
United States Navy sailors
African-American pianists
African-American guitarists
20th-century African-American male singers
Singer-songwriters from West Virginia
African-American United States Navy personnel